In supply chain management and transportation planning, the last mile is the last leg of a journey comprising the movement of people and goods from a transportation hub to a final destination. "Last mile" was adopted from the telecommunications industry which faced difficulty connecting individual homes to the main telecommunications network. Similarly, in supply chain management last-mile describes the difficult last part in the transportation of people and packages from hubs to final destinations. Last-mile delivery is an increasingly studied field as the number of business-to-consumer (b2c) deliveries grow especially from e-commerce companies in freight transportation, and ride-sharing companies in personal transportation. Some challenges of last-mile delivery include minimizing cost, ensuring transparency, increasing efficiency, and improving infrastructure.

History 

"Last mile" was originally used in the telecommunications industry to describe the difficulty of connecting end users' homes and businesses to the main telecommunication network. The last "mile" of cable or wire is only used by one customer. Therefore the cost of installing and maintaining this infrastructure can only be amortized over one subscriber, compared to many customers in the main "trunks" of the network.

In supply chain management last-mile describes a similar problem for transporting either people or freight. In freight networks, parcels can be delivered to a central hub efficiently via ship, train or other means, but they must then be loaded into smaller vehicles for delivery to individual customers. In transportation networks, "last mile" describes the rising marginal cost of getting people from a transportation hub such as an airport or train station to their final destination.

Usage in distribution networks
Transporting goods via freight rail networks and container ships is often the most efficient and cost-effective manner of shipping. However, when goods arrive at a high-capacity freight station or port, they must then be transported to their final destination. This last leg of the supply chain is often less efficient, comprising up to 53% of the total cost to move goods. This has become known as the "last mile problem." The last mile problem can also include the challenge of making deliveries in urban areas. Deliveries to retail stores, restaurants, and other merchants in a central business district often contribute to congestion and safety problems.

A related last mile problem is the transportation of goods to areas in need of humanitarian relief. Aid supplies are sometimes able to reach a central transportation hub in an affected area but cannot be distributed due to damage caused by a natural disaster or a lack of infrastructure.

One challenge faced in last-mile delivery is unattended packages. Shipping companies, like UPS, FedEx, USPS, DHL and others, leave a parcel unattended at a business or home which exposes the item(s) to weather, and the chance of theft by "porch pirates" (a person who steals packages off of customers' porches or front door areas). One solution to this problem is setting up lockers in urban centers. Amazon in the United States has deployed lockers where customers can pick up packages rather than them being left at their home. This protects them from theft and damage as well as allowing companies to deliver to one location, rather than a number of individual homes or businesses. Similarly, in Taiwan, some online vendors offer the option of delivery to a convenience store of the customer's choice, for pickup from the store by the customer. Not only does this reduce the chance of theft and consolidate packages but also pay for the purchase at the store may also be offered.

To reduce cost retailers have researched using autonomous vehicles to deliver packages. US-based Amazon and China-based Alibaba have researched deploying drones for delivering goods to consumers. In Europe, Germany, Britain, and Poland have experimented with services that provide automated parcel delivery.

Usage in transportation networks

"Last mile" also describes the difficulty in getting people from a transportation hub, especially railway stations, bus depots, and ferry berths, to their final destination. When users have difficulty getting from their starting location to a transportation network, the scenario may alternatively be known as the "first-mile problem." In the United States, land-use patterns have moved jobs and people to lower-density suburbs that are often not within walking distance of existing public transportation options. Therefore, transit use in these areas is often less practical. Critics claim this promotes a reliance on cars, which results in more traffic congestion, pollution, and urban sprawl.

Solutions to the last mile problem in public transit have included the use of feeder buses, bicycling infrastructure, and urban planning reform. Other methods of alleviating the last mile problem such as bicycle sharing systems, car sharing programs, pod cars (personal rapid transit), and motorized shoes have been proposed with varying degrees of adoption. Late in 2015, the Ford Motor Company received a patent for a "self-propelled unicycle engageable with vehicle", which is intended as a last mile commuter solution. Bicycle sharing programs have been successfully implemented in Europe and Asia, and are beginning to be implemented in North America. Starting in late 2017, micro-mobility services that provide shared vehicles such as dockless electric kick scooters or electric-assist bikes entered the marketplace. Dual-mode vehicles, which can operate on infrastructure and outside of infrastucture, are also considered as a solution to the first-mile and last-mile problem. The same dual-mode vehicle can make the journey to a station and from the station on using infrastructure.

Last mile technology platforms
Due in part to demand on retailers and product manufacturers to provide expedited (same and next day) deliveries, tech-enabled last-mile technology platforms have emerged. Increased demand for last-mile fulfillment has put pressure on shippers to manage many types of delivery companies, which range from traditional parcel carriers, to couriers, to on-demand service providers that execute an "Uber for delivery" model utilizing contractors.

Matching the supply of delivery with the demand that has been created by shippers is a problem that is being addressed by several last-mile technology platforms. These companies connect shippers to delivery service providers to facilitate final mile deliveries. These last-mile technology platforms allow real-time data to be received by the shipper and the receiver which enables managers to act immediately when exceptions such as late delivery, address error, or product damage occurs.

As Amazon strengthens its last-mile logistics capabilities, competing retailers have become more interested than ever in last-mile technologies to compete. The fear of Amazon has compelled CEOs of major transportation and logistics companies to seek alternative strategies.

Robots

Sidewalk robots 

A number of companies are actively using small delivery robots to do the last-mile delivery of small packages such as food and groceries just using the pedestrian areas of the road and travelling at speed comparable with a fast walking pace, companies actively delivering include:
 Starship Technologies – by January 2021, it had made over a million deliveries
 Serve robotics – delivering the Los Angeles area
 Tiny Mile – delivering the Toronto area
 Kiwibot – 120,00 deliveries made by 2017

Drones 
 Zipline – robotic airplanes delivering medicine and blood supplies using parachutes; by June 2022, they had made 325,000 deliveries this way

See also
 Active mobility
 Cyclability
 Electric bicycle
 Transit-oriented development – a method for solving the last mile problem by building high-density development within walking distance of a transit station

References

Freight transport
Transportation engineering